The Quebec Federation of Real Estate Boards (QFREB), or Fédération des Chambres immobilières du Québec (FCIQ), represents the 12,000+ real estate brokers and salespeople who are members of Quebec's 12 real estate boards.

History
 1991 - QFREB founded

See also
 Canadian Real Estate Association
 Greater Montreal Real Estate Board
 Multiple Listing Service

External links
 Quebec Federal of Real Estate Boards
 Association des courtiers et agents immobiliers du Québec (ACAIQ)
 Real Estate Brokerage Act, R.S.Q. c. C-73.1

References

Real estate industry trade groups based in Canada
1991 establishments in Quebec
Economy of Quebec

Trade associations based in Quebec